Sir Arthur William Street, GCB, KBE, CMG, CIE, MC (16 May 1892 – 24 February 1951) was a British civil servant. He joined the civil service as a boy clerk at the age of 14 and studied at King's College London while working. His career was interrupted by service in the First World War; after demobilisation in 1919 he worked in the Ministry of Agriculture and Fisheries (with the exception of the period 1921–22 when was in the Admiralty); he was second secretary from 1936 to 1938. In 1938, he moved to the Air Ministry; from 1939 to 1945, he was its Permanent Secretary, serving throughout the Second World War. He was then the Permanent Secretary of the Control Office for Germany and Austria from 1945 to 1946, before serving as deputy chairman of the National Coal Board until his death.

References 

1892 births
1951 deaths
English civil servants
Alumni of King's College London
Knights Grand Cross of the Order of the Bath
Knights Commander of the Order of the British Empire
Companions of the Order of St Michael and St George
Companions of the Order of the Indian Empire